Liu Kang (16 February 1961 – 29 March 2013, aged 52) was a Chinese football player and coach.

Playing career
Liu played senior football for his home team Guangzhou in his whole career.

Management career
He became a football coach after his retirement in 1990. He mainly served two football clubs in Guangzhou (Guangzhou Matsunichi and Guangzhou F.C.) in his manager career.

Death
On 29 March 2013, Liu died of lung cancer in Guangzhou, aged 52, after a four-month-battle with the disease.

References

1961 births
2013 deaths
Chinese footballers
Chinese football managers
Footballers from Guangzhou
Guangzhou F.C. players
Association football midfielders
Guangzhou F.C. managers
Deaths from lung cancer
Deaths from cancer in the People's Republic of China